Zhongyuan District is one of 6 urban districts of the prefecture-level city of Zhengzhou, the capital of Henan Province, South Central China. The city government is located in this district.

Zhongyuan is the second most populous district in Zhengzhou with a population of over 900,000. It is the city's industrial center especially in textiles, though many factories are closing and moving into more remote areas due to pollution. Zhengzhou University is located in the district  Zhongyuan is undergoing a construction boom though not as intense as the eastern area of the city.

Administrative divisions
As 2012, this city is divided to 12 subdistricts, 1 town and 1 township.
Subdistricts

Towns
Shifo

Townships
Gouzhao Township

References

External links
 Official website of Zhongyuan District government

Districts of Zhengzhou